Hockey Wales is the national governing body for hockey in Wales. Established as the Welsh Hockey Union in 1996, by the merger of the Welsh Hockey Association (founded 1896) and the Welsh Women's Hockey Association (founded 1897), it rebranded as Hockey Wales in 2011. Hockey Wales is responsible for the administration of all aspects of the game in Wales, including clubs, competitions, development, internationals, schools, umpiring and universities.

National competitions include men's and women's Welsh Cups. Internationally, Welsh players compete at the Olympic games as part of the Great Britain team. In all other competitions, including the Hockey World Cup and the Commonwealth Games, Wales' national women's team and men's team compete in their own right. The Wales hockey team also compete at the EuroHockey Nations Trophy (ENT), which was held in Wrexham in August 2009. Other countries that compete at the ENT are Belarus, Czech Republic, Ireland, Italy, Russia, Scotland and Switzerland.

Hockey Wales is based in Sport Wales National Centre, Sophia Gardens, Cardiff.

The team's logo is that of the Prince of Wales's feathers with the German motto 'Ich dien' (meaning 'I serve'), underneath the feathers is the English name 'Hockey Wales' in bold text, followed by the Welsh translation 'Hoci Cymru' in regular text.

References

External links
 European Hockey Federation (EHF)

Wales
Hockey
Field hockey in Wales
Organisations based in Cardiff
1996 establishments in Wales
Sports organizations established in 1996